Maha Dewi was a principal queen consort of King Mingyi Nyo of Toungoo Dynasty. She was also known as Wadi Mibaya. On 11 April 1511, Mingyi Nyo held his coronation ceremony, in which he bestowed her the title of Maha Dewi. She had no children.

References

Bibliography
 
 

Queens consort of Toungoo dynasty
16th-century Burmese women